This article documents expected notable spaceflight events during the 2020s.

Overview 
The trend towards cost reduction in access to orbit is expected to continue. In early 2023, SpaceX plans to launch its new fully reusable Starship to orbit and Vulcan is planned to replace its more expensive predecessors. In late 2023, Ariane 6 is expected to replace the more expensive Ariane 5 in 2023, and Blue Origin plans the maiden flight of New Glenn with a reusable first stage.

Mars stays a focus for missions to other planets, with three missions launched in 2020 (by China, the United Arab Emirates and the United States) and at least two missions planned for 2024 (India and Japan).

In 2028, as part of the NASA-ESA Mars Sample Return mission, NASA plans to launch a Sample Retrieval Lander. In 2027, ESA plans to launch the Earth Return Orbiter, which will transport the retrieved samples from Mars to Earth by 2033. China is also planning to retrieve samples from Mars by 2031.

NASA plans a return of humans to the Moon by 2025. The first uncrewed launch of the Space Launch System happened in 2022. The first crewed launch is planned for 2024. In addition NASA plans to assemble the Lunar Gateway in lunar orbit. A crewed exploration of Mars could follow in the mid 2030s. SpaceX, a private company, has also announced plans to land humans on Mars in the 2020s, with the long-term goal of enabling the colonization of Mars.

India plans to launch its first crewed flight with a spacecraft called Gaganyaan on a home-grown GSLV Mark III rocket in 2024. The mission would make India the fourth nation to launch a crewed spaceflight after Russia, the US and China. India also plans to launch its second Mars probe, Mars Orbiter Mission 2 (Mangalyaan 2), in 2024.

The James Webb Space Telescope was launched in 2021. NASA plans to launch the Nancy Grace Roman Space Telescope, which will have a field of view 100 times larger than that of the Hubble Space Telescope, between October 2026 and May 2027.

The number of small satellites launched annually was expected to grow to around one thousand (2018 estimate), mainly communication satellites in large constellations but launches quickly exceeded this estimate, mainly due to the rapid deployment of the Starlink and OneWeb constellations. From 2020 to 2022, around 3500 Starlink satellites and 500 satellites by OneWeb were launched.

By year

References

External links

 
Spaceflight by decade
Space
2020s decade overviews